Margaret Rhee is a feminist experimental poet, new media artist, and scholar. Her research focuses on technology, and intersections with feminist, queer, and ethnic studies. She has a special interest on digital participatory action research and pedagogy.

Education 
Rhee holds a Ph.D. from the University of California Berkeley in Ethnic Studies with a designated emphasis in New Media Studies. She received her B.A. in English/Creative Writing from the University of Southern California.

Poetry 
Her chapbook Yellow was published in 2011 by Tinfish Press/University of Hawaii. In 2016, she published Radio Heart; or, How Robots Fall Out of Love with Finishing Line Press. In 2017, her poetry collection Love, Robot was published by The Operating System.

She currently serves as managing editor of Mixed Blood, a literary journal on race and experimental poetry published out of the University of California, Berkeley.  She co-edited the collections Here is a Pen: An Anthology of West Coast Kundiman Poets  (Achiote Press) and online anthology Glitter Tongue: queer and trans love poems. Her poetry has been published at the Berkeley Poetry Review, Lantern Review: A Journal of Asian American Poetry, and Mission At Tenth.

Research and teaching 
Her scholarship has been published at Amerasia Journal, Information Society, and Sexuality Research and Social Policy. As a digital activist and new media artist she is co-lead and conceptualist of From the Center a feminist HIV/AIDS digital storytelling education project implemented in the San Francisco Jail. For this project, she was awarded the Chancellor’s Award in Public Service from UC Berkeley and the Yamashita Prize Honorable Mention for young activists by the Center for Social Change. She currently serves on the board of directors for social justice organizations, DataCenter  and the Queer Women of Color Media Arts Project.

She was the Institute of American Cultures Visiting Researcher in Asian American Studies at UCLA for 2014 - 2015. From 2004 - 2006, she worked as an editor for publications YOLK Magazine, Chopblock.com, and Backstage.

Currently, she is a College Fellow at Harvard University in the Department of English, and Assistant Professor at SUNY Buffalo in the Department of Media Study.

References 

Living people
American feminists
American women poets
University of California, Berkeley alumni
University of Southern California alumni
New media artists
Year of birth missing (living people)
University at Buffalo faculty
American women academics
21st-century American women
Electronic literature writers